Wilfrid Wilson Gibson (2 October 1878 – 26 May 1962) was a British Georgian poet, associated with World War I but also the author of much later work.

Early work

Gibson was born in Hexham, Northumberland, and left the north for London in 1914 after his mother died. He had been publishing poems in magazines since 1895, and his first collections in book form were published by Elkin Mathews in 1902. His collections of verse plays and dramatic poems The Stonefolds and On The Threshold were published by the Samurai Press (of Cranleigh) in 1907, followed next year by the book of poems, The Web of Life.

Despite his residence in London, and later in Gloucestershire, many of Gibson's poems both then and later, have Northumberland settings: Hexham's Market Cross; Hareshaw; and The Kielder Stone. Others deal with poverty and passion amid wild Northumbrian landscapes. Still others are devoted to fishermen, industrial workers and miners, often alluding to local ballads and the rich folk-song heritage of the North East.

In London, he met both Edward Marsh and Rupert Brooke, becoming a close friend and later Brooke's literary executor (with Lascelles Abercrombie and Walter de la Mare). This was at the period when the first Georgian Poetry anthology was being hatched. Gibson was one of the insiders.

During the early part of his writing life, Wilfrid Wilson Gibson wrote poems that featured the "macabre". One such poem is "Flannan Isle", based on a real-life mystery.

Gibson was one of the founders of the Dymock poets, a community of writers who settled briefly, before the outbreak of the Great War, in the village of Dymock, in north Gloucestershire.

Some indications show that he wrote prose, as well. For instance, he wrote and argued beautifully about the merit of verse at the time of World War II. He wrote a piece of criticism on Italian Nationalism and English Letters by Harry W. Rudman regarding the contributions made by Italian exiles in England to English literature, which were in the form of poetry by and large. He also wrote criticism on The Burning Oracle: Studies in the Poetry of Action by G. Wilson Knight, wherein he commends the fact that Knight sees the creative energy of living writers not only in the creation of artworks, but also in the creation of life itself.

Death and reputation
Gibson died on 26 May 1962, in Virginia Water, Surrey.

His reputation was eclipsed somewhat by the Ezra Pound-T. S. Eliot school of Modernist poetry,<ref>The Literary Encyclopedia states that his reputation plummeted. Whistler p. 282 has Gibson's was the saddest fate of all the Georgians. Once acclaimed as the leader of an exciting new movement, when that movement came into derision the critics found in him the epitome of its vices.</ref> though  his work remained popular.

Further reading
Dominic Hibberd, Wilfrid Gibson and Harold Monro, the Pioneers'' (Cecil Woolf, 2006)

Notes

External links

 Page at Spartacus
 Elizabeth Whitcomb Houghton Collection, containing letters by Gibson
 Gloucestershire Poets, Writers and Artists Collection University of Gloucestershire Archives and Special Collections
 
 
 
 
 Archival material at 

1878 births
1962 deaths
20th-century English poets
People from Hexham
British Army soldiers
British Army personnel of World War I
British World War I poets
20th-century English male writers
English male poets
People from Dymock